Henry St. John (July 16, 1783May 17, 1869) was a U.S. Representative from Ohio.

Biography
Born in Washington County, Vermont, St. John received limited schooling.
He served during the War of 1812 before moving to Wooster, Ohio, in 1815. Later, he moved to Crawford County, Ohio. In 1837, he settled in Seneca County, where he engaged in agricultural pursuits, milling, and storekeeping near Tiffin, Ohio.

St. John was elected as a Democrat to the Twenty-eighth and Twenty-ninth Congresses (March 4, 1843 – March 3, 1847).
He was not a candidate for renomination.
After leaving Congress, he resumed agricultural pursuits.
Resided in Tiffin, Ohio, where he died in May 1869.

Sources

1783 births
1869 deaths
People from Washington County, Vermont
People from Tiffin, Ohio
United States Army personnel of the War of 1812
Democratic Party members of the United States House of Representatives from Ohio
19th-century American politicians